Grand Prix du Morbihan is a single-day men's road bicycle race held annually in May around Plumelec, in the region of Brittany, France. Since 2020, the race is organised as a 1.Pro event on the UCI ProSeries, also being part of the French Road Cycling Cup.

A women's race, the Grand Prix du Morbihan Féminin, has been held the same day since 2011.

Name of the race
1988–2000: A Travers le Morbihan
2001–2019: Grand Prix de Plumelec-Morbihan
2021–: Grand Prix du Morbihan

Winners

References

External links
  

UCI Europe Tour races
Recurring sporting events established in 1974
1974 establishments in France
Cycle races in France
Breton sport and leisure
Sport in Morbihan